The American Council of Engineering Companies (ACEC) is the oldest and largest business association of engineering companies. It is organized as a federation of 52 state and regional councils with national headquarters in Washington, D.C., comprising thousands of engineering practices throughout the country. It administers extensive lobbying and education programs.

History
ACEC traces its roots to the Association of Architectural Engineers, founded in New York City in 1905 to promote the business interests of consulting engineers. The organization, which was based on individual memberships, changed its name to the American Institute of Consulting Engineers (AICE) in 1909. Similar organizations soon sprung up in many states. In 1930, notable member Blake R. Van Leer lobbied congress for a National Museum of Engineering and Industry.

In 1956, representatives from 10 state associations created a national Consulting Engineers Council (CEC), representing engineering firms rather than individuals. By 1960, CEC had grown to 29 state member organizations, representing more than 1,000 firms.

In 1973, CEC and AICE merged to create the American Consulting Engineers Council (ACEC). To accommodate the individual members of AICE, the new organization created a College of Fellows membership category.

ACEC's advocacy activities covered a broad range of issues, sometimes necessitating the creation of spin-off groups to pursue specific goals. For example, in 1986, ACEC founded the American Tort Reform Association (ATRA) to lobby for the reform of unfair liability statutes nationwide.

In 2000, ACEC changed its name to the American Council of Engineering Companies to reflect both its firm-based membership and the increasingly diversified and multi-disciplinary nature of engineering practices, including design-build practices.

In 2006, President George W. Bush gave a major mid-term address at the ACEC Annual Convention in Washington, D.C., recognizing the organization for its public policy advocacy.

In 2012, along with the American Public Works Association (APWA) and American Society of Civil Engineers (ASCE), ACEC founded the Institute for Sustainable Infrastructure (ISI), which has developed the Envision® sustainability rating system for infrastructure works.

In May of 2022, ACEC opened the doors to its new office located at 1400 L Street, NW in Washington, replacing the Council's longstanding former office location at 1015 15th Street, NW.

Advocacy
ACEC advocates for the business interests of its member firms before legislatures, executive agencies, courts, and in public media.

Qualifications-Based Selection (QBS). In 1972, the Council was a prime mover in the passage of the A/E Selection Procedures Act, also known as the Brooks Act, which requires that the U.S. Federal Government procure engineering and architecture services through Qualifications-Based Selection (QBS) rather than solely by price. Most states have adopted similar legislation. ACEC today seeks to bolster and expand the reach of QBS as a business “best practice” to ensure innovation, successful performance and public safety.

Contracting Out. The Council is a strong proponent of both federal and state bodies contracting out engineering services, asserting that such work is not “inherently governmental” and can be best and most economically performed by the private sector.

In 2000, ACEC was a key advocate of the "Thomas Amendment" in the Water Resources and Development Act, which limits the extent to which the U.S. Army Corps of Engineers can compete with private engineering firms in municipal works such as schools, hospitals, and utilities.

In 2016, an ACEC-sponsored contracting out study, conducted by New York University, concluded that contracting out of engineering services by state departments of transportation provided demonstrable savings over having those same services performed by DOT in-house operations.

Acquisition Regulations. In 2011, ACEC led a large business coalition that won repeal of the 3 percent withholding provision on federal, state, and local contracts.

The Council has also: secured reforms in Federal Acquisition Regulations (FAR) pertaining to overhead and audit requirements; removed the mandatory 10 percent retainage on fixed-private federal architectural/engineering (A/E) contracts; expanded opportunities for small firms to compete for Department of Defense contracts; exempted A/E services from Project Labor Agreements on federal projects; and secured reforms to the federal design-build competition process.

Infrastructure Investment. ACEC has been a leading proponent of increased infrastructure investment in surface transportation, water, aviation and energy.

ACEC has supported the passage of every long-term surface transportation program, including the Intermodal Surface Transportation Efficiency Act (ISTEA) (1991), Transportation Equity Act for the 21st Century (TEA-21) (1998), Safe, Accountable, Flexible, Efficient Transportation Equity Act: A Legacy for Users (SAFETEA-LU) (2005), Moving Ahead for Progress in the 21st Century Act (MAP-21) (2012), and Fixing America’s Surface Transportation Act (FAST Act) (2015).

Tax Reform. In 2004, ACEC helped win passage of a 9 percent tax deduction for engineering and other firms as part of the American Jobs Creation Act; in 2011, defeated a mandate for filing 1099 forms for every purchase of goods valued at more than $600; and in 2016, secured the extension of key tax benefits for engineering firms, including the R&D tax credit, bonus depreciation, small business expensing, and renewable energy tax credits. The Council also continues to seek the protection of the cash method of accounting.

Risk Management. ACEC helps member firms in understanding and managing risk, and advocates for legislative and regulatory reforms to properly control and fairly allocate risk.

In recent years, ACEC has won judicial or legislative victories on issues including indemnification provisions, the duty to defend, and the Economic Loss Doctrine. Each year, ACEC conducts annual Professional Liability Insurance Surveys of member and carriers to gauge current market conditions.

Political Action Committee

The American Council of Engineering Companies Political Action Committee (ACEC/PAC) is a $1 million-plus annual PAC, the largest PAC in the A/E industry and among the top 3 percent of all federal PACs.

During the 2014-2016 election cycle, the PAC contributed more than $2 million to Congressional campaigns and had a 97 percent win record.

ACEC/PAC is bipartisan, funded solely by ACEC member contributions, and supports pro-business candidates.

In 2021 ACEC opened the doors to a new townhouse on Capitol Hill to host events tied to ACEC/PAC and the political programs of its Member Organizations.

Education

The Council holds more than 100 online classes annually, covering a wide range of business management and engineering topics.

ACEC's Senior Executives Institute (SEI) provides advanced management, leadership and public policy training for firm leaders. More than 500 executives have participated in the program.

In cooperation with the Federal Highway Administration, ACEC holds regular on-site educational workshops on Federal Acquisition Regulations.

Publications

ACEC publishes Engineering Inc., a quarterly print and online magazine focusing on engineering business issues.

Last Word is the Council's weekly online membership newsletter.

The "Tuesday Letter" e-mail communication from the ACEC CEO's office.

The quarterly ACEC Engineering Business Index surveys member CEOs on the health of the engineering industry.

The Engineers Joint Contract Document Committee (EJCDC)  is a collaboration of ACEC, ASCE, and the National Society of Professional Engineers (NSPE)  to develop and disseminate standard contract documents for use in design and construction projects.

The Engineering Influence podcast.

Conferences

ACEC hosts two conferences per year. Each spring, the ACEC Annual Convention and Legislative Summit is held in Washington, D.C., featuring political speakers and member visits to congressional offices, as well as business education.

The ACEC Fall Conference is held in different locations each year and focuses on business practice issues, markets, and political developments.

Awards Programs
Engineering Excellence Awards—Introduced in 1967, the Engineering Excellence Awards (EEA) program annually honors outstanding engineering accomplishments.
Community Service Awards—Given annually to member firm principals who have made outstanding contributions to the quality of life in their community.
Distinguished Award of Merit—The Council's highest award, given to individuals for exemplary achievement. Recipients include former Presidents Dwight D. Eisenhower and Herbert Hoover, General Lucius Clay, Admiral Hyman G. Rickover, Carl Sagan, W. Edwards Deming, and Neil Armstrong.
QBS Awards Program—Co-sponsored with NSPE, the QBS Awards recognize public and private entities that make exemplary use of the qualifications-based selection (QBS) process at the state and local levels.
Young Professional of the Year Award—This award promotes the accomplishments of young engineers by highlighting their engineering contributions and the resulting impact on society.
ACEC also awards six student scholarships annually.

References

External links
 

Engineering organizations